Portacosa is a genus of wolf spiders containing the single species, Portacosa cinerea. It was  first described by V. W. Framenau in 2017, and is only found in Australia.

References

External links

Lycosidae
Monotypic Araneomorphae genera